País Portátil is a Venezuelan film screened in 1979 and directed by Iván Feo and Antonio Llerandi based on the novel of Adriano González León. The film is part of UNESCO's Memory of the World Programme National Cinematic Heritage.

Cast 
 Alejandra Pinedo - Delia
 Héctor Duvauchelle - Salvador Barazarte
 Iván Feo - Andrés Barazarte
 Eliseo Perera - León Perfecto Barazarte
 Silvia Santelices - Ernestina Barazarte
 Eduardo Gil - Nicolasito Barazarte
 Ibsen Martínez - José Eladio Barazarte
 Nardy Fernández - Hortensia Barazarte
 Fausto Verdial - Eliseo Quintero
 Iván González - Jaramillo
 Asdrúbal Melendez - "Cura de la iglesia"
 Maria Luisa Lamata - Adelaida Saavedra
 Fernando Gómez - Epifanio Barazarte

References

External links
 

Venezuelan drama films
1979 films